In number theory, Lagrange's theorem is a statement named after Joseph-Louis Lagrange about how frequently a polynomial over the integers may evaluate to a multiple of a fixed prime.
  has at most  solutions

If the modulus is not prime, then it is possible for there to be more than  solutions.

A proof of Lagrange's theorem

The two key ideas are the following. Now:

  is divisible by  if and only if ; and
  has no more than  roots.

Assume ; its degree is thus well-defined. It is easy to see . To prove (2), note that  is a field, which is a standard fact (a quick proof is to note that since  is prime,  is a finite integral domain, hence is a field). Another standard fact is that a non-zero polynomial over a field has at most as many roots as its degree; this follows from the division algorithm.

Finally, note that two solutions  are incongruent if and only if  .

References
 
 

Theorems about prime numbers
Theorems about polynomials